The National Basketball Association awards the Community Assist Award for community engagement, philanthropic activity, and charity work. It is a monthly award, but season and off-season awards have also been given. In some cases multiple awards have been given in the same month. The award is sponsored by Kia Motors and is part of the NBA Cares program.
In the 2012–13 NBA season the season long award was accompanied by a $25,000 donation from Kia and the NBA to a charity of the recipients choice.

David Robinson Plaque 
The winner of the award is presented a plaque dedicated to David Robinson. The plaque is inscribed. "Following the standard set by NBA Legend David Robinson, who improved the community piece by piece."

Award winners

Monthly award winners
2001–02 season
 Jerry Stackhouse (October) 
 Shareef Abdur-Rahim (November) 
 Eric Snow (December) 
 Adonal Foyle (January) 
 Kevin Garnett (February) 
 Desmond Mason (March) 
 Shane Battier (April) 
 Reggie Miller (May) 
 Antoine Walker (June) 
 Jason Terry (July) 
 Shawn Marion (August) 
 P. J. Brown (September) 
2002–03 season
 Todd MacCulloch (October) 
 Michael Finley (November)
 Michael Curry (December)
 Malik Rose (January)
 Chris Webber (February)
 Darrell Armstrong (March)
 Allan Houston (April)
 Jerry Stackhouse (May)
 Troy Hudson (June-Project Salute)
 Ervin Johnson (June-Project Salute)
 Mark Madsen (June-Project Salute)
 Cherokee Parks (June-Project Salute)
 Shawn Marion (June-Project Salute)
 Antawn Jamison (July)
 Jalen Rose (August)
 Dikembe Mutombo (September)
2003–04 season
 Rashard Lewis (October)
 Aaron McKie (November)
 Marc Jackson (November)
 Jermaine O'Neal (December)
 Karl Malone (January)
 Dirk Nowitzki (February)
 Carlos Boozer (March)
 Derek Fisher (April)
 Lamar Odom (May)
 Kurt Thomas (June)
 Allen Iverson (July)
 Carmelo Anthony (August-Team USA)
 Carlos Boozer (August-Team USA)
 Tim Duncan (August-Team USA)
 Allen Iverson (August-Team USA)
 LeBron James (August-Team USA)
 Richard Jefferson (August-Team USA)
 Stephon Marbury (August-Team USA)
 Shawn Marion (August-Team USA)
 Lamar Odom (August-Team USA)
 Emeka Okafor (August-Team USA)
 Amar'e Stoudemire (August-Team USA)
 Dwyane Wade (August-Team USA)
 Adonal Foyle (September)
2004–05 season
 Damon Stoudamire (October)
 Steven Hunter (November)
 Marc Jackson (November)
 Shaquille O'Neal (December)
 Marcus Camby (January)
 Rasheed Wallace (February)
 Bruce Bowen (March)
 Derek Fisher (April)
 Jerome Williams (May)
 Chris Bosh (June)
 Vince Carter (July)
 Gilbert Arenas (August)
 NBA Players involved in Katrina efforts (September)
2005–06 season
 Drew Gooden (October)
 Kevin Garnett (November)
 Chris Webber (December)
 Bruce Bowen (January)
 Charlie Villanueva (February)
 Raja Bell (March)
 Rasheed Wallace (April)
 Theo Ratliff (May)
 LeBron James (June)
 Alonzo Mourning (July)
 Bo Outlaw (August)
 Chris Paul (September)
2006–07 season
 Eric Snow (October)
 Marcus Banks (November)
 Jermaine O'Neal (December)
 Rasual Butler (January)
 Greg Buckner (February)
 Al Harrington (March)
 Luol Deng (April)
 Mike Miller (May)
 Caron Butler (June)
 Dwight Howard (July)
 Dwyane Wade (August)
 Emeka Okafor (September)
2007–08 season
 Jamal Crawford (October)
 Chris Duhon (November)
 Dirk Nowitzki (December)
 Tracy McGrady (January)
 Al Horford (February)
 Stephen Jackson (March)
 Kevin Garnett (April)
 Mike Miller (May)
 LeBron James (June)
 Alonzo Mourning (July)
 Charlie Villanueva (August)
 Chris Paul (September)
2008–09 season
 Amar'e Stoudemire (October)
 Jason Terry (November)
 Peja Stojaković (December)
 Dwight Howard (January)
 Samuel Dalembert (February)
 Devin Harris (March)
 Leon Powe (April)
 Daequan Cook (off-season)
2009–10 season
 Dwight Howard (October)
 Shaquille O'Neal (November)
 Jason Kidd (December)
 Samuel Dalembert (January)
 Ronny Turiaf (February)
 Rudy Gay (March)
 Juwan Howard (April)
 Dwyane Wade (off-season)
2010–11 season
 Chris Paul (October)
 Deron Williams (November)
 Zach Randolph (December)
 Ray Allen (January)
 Brandon Jennings (February)
 Al Horford (March)
2011–12 season
 Wesley Matthews (February)
 Gerald Henderson (March)
 Rudy Gay (April)
 Pau Gasol (May)
2012–13 season
 Deron Williams (November)
 Kevin Love (December)
 Zach Randolph (January)
 Kenneth Faried (February)
 Damian Lillard (March)
 Chris Paul (April)
2013–14 season
 George Hill (October)
 Zach Randolph (November)
 Rajon Rondo (December)
 Stephen Curry (January)
 Anthony Davis (February)
 Dwight Howard (March)

2014–15 season
 Russell Westbrook (October)
 Klay Thompson (November)
 Ben McLemore (December)
 Anthony Davis (January)
 Joakim Noah (February)
 Tobias Harris (March)
 Chris Paul (April)

2015–16 season
 John Wall (October)
 Carmelo Anthony (November)
 Victor Oladipo (December)
 Mike Conley (January)
 Andre Drummond (February)
 Anthony Davis (March)
 Zach LaVine (April)

2016–17 season
 Tobias Harris (October)
 CJ McCollum (November)
 Isaiah Thomas (December)
 Zach Randolph (January)
 Elfrid Payton (February)
 Jrue Holiday (March)
 Jimmy Butler (April)

2017–18 season
 DeMarcus Cousins (off-season)
 JJ Barea (October)
 Ricky Rubio (November)
 LeBron James (December)
 Kevin Durant (January)
 CJ McCollum (February)
 Dwyane Wade (March)

2018–19 season
 LeBron James (off-season)
 Dwight Powell (October)
 Damian Lillard (November)
 Khris Middleton (December)
 Mike Conley (January)
 Pascal Siakam (February)
 Jarrett Allen (March)

2019–20 season
 Gorgui Dieng (off-season)
 Kevin Love (October)
 Devin Booker (November)
 DeAndre Jordan (December)
 Trae Young (January)
 Langston Galloway (February)

2020–21 season
 Donovan Mitchell (off-season)
 Jrue Holiday & Josh Richardson (January)
 Patty Mills (February)
 Joel Embiid (March)
 Damian Lillard (April)
 Devin Booker (May)

2021–22 season
 Ricky Rubio (off-season)
 Tobias Harris (October)
 Karl-Anthony Towns (November)
 Jaren Jackson Jr. (December)

Season-long award winners
Pau Gasol (2011–12)
Dwyane Wade (2012–13)
Stephen Curry (2013–14)
Russell Westbrook (2014–15)
John Wall (2015–16)
Isaiah Thomas (2016–17)
Kevin Durant (2017–18)
Bradley Beal (2018–19)
Harrison Barnes, Jaylen Brown, George Hill, Chris Paul, Dwight Powell (2019–20)
Devin Booker (2020–21)
Gary Payton II (2021–22)

See also 
 Walter Payton NFL Man of the Year Award (football)
 Allstate AFCA Good Works Team
 Bart Starr Award (football)
 J. Walter Kennedy Citizenship Award (basketball)

References

External links

Community Assist
National Basketball Association lists
Awards established in 2001